Sybrinus x-ornatus is a species of beetle in the family Cerambycidae. It was described by Téocchi, Jiroux and Sudre in 2007. It is known from Yemen.

References

Desmiphorini
Beetles described in 2007